Ted White may refer to:

 Ted White (author) (born 1938), American science fiction author
 Ted White (stuntman) (1926–2022), American stuntman
 Ted White (cricketer) (1913–1999), Australian cricketer
 Ted White (politician) (born 1949), Canadian politician
 Ted White (American football) (born 1976), American football offensive coordinator
 Ted White (manager), first husband of Aretha Franklin

See also
 Edward White (disambiguation)
 Theodore H. White (1915–1986), American journalist and author